is a Japanese professional footballer who plays as a forward or a winger for  club Kashima Antlers.

Career statistics

Club
.

References

External links

2001 births
Living people
Japanese footballers
Association football forwards
J1 League players
J2 League players
Kashima Antlers players
Tokyo Verdy players